Henryk Bem (born 1940 in Łódź) is a Polish chemist, professor at Lodz University of Technology.

In 1962 he graduated from Lodz University of Technology, the Faculty of Chemistry, where in 1979 obtained a Ph.D. degree in chemistry. Since then he worked in the Department of Physical Chemistry until 1987. After the reorganisation, he worked in the Institute of Applied Radiation Chemistry. In the years 1979-1984 he did internship and then worked as a research associate at Dalhousie University in Canada. In 1987 he obtained a post-doctoral degree. From 1989 to 1995 he stayed in Kuwait in the Ministry of Health as a consultant for Radiological Protection. In 1997 he held a position of an associate professor in the Institute of Applied Radiation Chemistry and in 2003 was awarded a title of Professor of Chemical Sciences.

His scientific interests concentrate on new methods for the quantitative determination of radionuclides in environmental samples as well as the impact of technical activities on natural radioactive decay level and additional degree of radiation hazard.

He is the author of over 80 scientific papers and 3 monographies, and is a fivefold doctoral advisor. He was from 1999 to 2005 the Deputy Dean for Education and in the years 2005-2008 the Dean of the Faculty of Chemistry at Lodz University of Technology.

Bibliography

References

1940 births
Academic staff of Łódź University of Technology
Polish chemists
Polish engineers
Łódź University of Technology alumni
Living people
Polish expatriates in Canada
Polish expatriates in Kuwait